Ronald Wayne Hutchinson (October 24, 1936 – July 10, 2021) was a Canadian professional ice hockey player who played nine games in the National Hockey League with the New York Rangers.

External links

1936 births
2021 deaths
Canadian ice hockey centres
Charlotte Checkers (EHL) players
Ice hockey people from Manitoba
New York Rangers players
Sportspeople from Flin Flon